Cuspidine is a fluorine bearing calcium silicate mineral (sorosilicate) with formula: Ca4(Si2O7)(F,OH)2. Cuspidine crystallizes in the monoclinic crystal system and occurs as acicular to spear shaped pale red to light brown crystals. It is a member of the wöhlerite group.

Cuspidine was first described in 1876 for an occurrence in Monte Somma, Italy. The name is from the Greek cuspis for  spear from its characteristic crystal form. Cuspidine occurs as crystals in tuff from Monte Somma. In the Franklin, New Jersey mine area it occurs in contact metamorphosed limestone. In Dupezeh Mountain, Iraq, it occurs in melilite bearing skarn. Associated minerals include augite, hornblende, diopside, grossular, biotite, phlogopite, monticellite, wollastonite, calcite, spinel, magnetite and perovskite.

References

Sorosilicates
Monoclinic minerals
Minerals in space group 14